Padovo may refer to two places in Slovenia:

Padovo pri Fari, a settlement in the Municipality of Kostel
Padovo pri Osilnici, a settlement in the Municipality of Osilnica